The 2007 Eurocup Formula Renault 2.0 season was the seventeenth Eurocup Formula Renault 2.0 season. The season began at Zolder on 21 April and finished at Barcelona on 28 October, after fourteen rounds.

The title was claimed by Epsilon RedBull driver Brendon Hartley with a round to spare. Hartley took four race wins during the season, two of which coming in the opening round at Zolder. He also took four further podium finishes en route to a 32-point championship win over Jon Lancaster. SG Formula's driver eventually ended the season also with four victories in two final rounds at Estoril and Barcelona.

Lancaster's teammate Charles Pic finished in third position, taking victory at the Nürburgring. He finished 17 points clear of Epsilon Euskadi's Stefano Coletti, who took win at the Hungaroring. Other victories were taken by Prema Powerteam's Henkie Waldschmidt at the Nürburgring and guest driver Mathieu Arzeno, who won both Magny-Cours races.

Teams and drivers
 Guest entries are listed in italics.

Calendar

Championship standings

Drivers
Points are awarded to the drivers as follows:

* - only awarded to race one polesitters

† — Drivers did not finish the race, but were classified as they completed over 90% of the race distance.

1 Pierre Combot raced as guest driver with Cram Competition in rounds Magny Cours and Barcelona.
2 Anton Nebylitskiy raced as guest driver with SG Formula at Estoril and Barcelona.

Teams

References

External links
 Official website of the Eurocup Formula Renault 2.0 championship

Eurocup
Eurocup Formula Renault
Renault Eurocup